"Themata" is a song by Australian progressive/alternative metal band Karnivool. It was released in July 2005 as the third and final single from their debut album Themata, following the singles, "L1FEL1KE" and "Roquefort".

"Themata" is the first song by Karnivool to chart on Triple J's Hottest 100, where it reached #97 in 2005.

The song was covered by Australian Idol contestant Reigan Derry in 2006.

"Themata" was performed by The Cavaliers Drum and Bugle Corps as part of their 2021 Production "LIVE! From The Rose".

Music video
The  for the song was released with the song on 11 June 2005. It was Karnivool's second music video, after  (2003).

The music video features the band playing in a room with red curtains, with the band's trademark, a little bug with what appear to be glass eyes, flying around. Some lyrics of the song flash up on screen and disappear again. The trademark bug is also seen in the video for Shutterspeed, and on the cover of Themata, both album and single. The video is edited down from the song's original length of 5 minutes 40 seconds to 4 minutes 35 seconds. In the part of the song where violins can be heard, three or four people playing violins appear in the room, then disappear again.

Track listing
Single

EP

Personnel
Karnivool
 Ian Kenny – lead vocals
 Drew Goddard – guitar, drums, backing vocals
 Mark Hosking – guitar, backing vocals
 Jon Stockman – bass

Additional
 Novac Bull – additional vocals
 Leigh Miller – string arrangements

References

Karnivool songs
2005 songs
2005 singles